John Rex Whinfield CBE (16 February 1901 in Sutton, Surrey, England – 6 July 1966 in Dorking, Surrey) was a British chemist. Together with James Tennant Dickson, Whinfield investigated polyesters and  produced and patented the first polyester fibre in 1941, which they named Terylene (also known as Dacron) equal to or surpassing nylon in toughness and resilience. He was born in Accrington, but moved out of town before the age of 4.

Education
Whinfield attended Merchant Taylors' School and Gonville and Caius College, Cambridge where he read natural sciences (1921) and chemistry (1922).

Career
He worked initially as an assistant to Charles Frederick Cross and Edward John Bevan, who had done earlier work on viscose rayon in 1892. In 1924 he was employed as a research chemist by the Calico Printers' Association based in Manchester.

During the late 1930s, the hunt was on for new synthetic fibres to rival Wallace H. Carothers' nylon. Whinfield and his assistant James Tennant Dickson investigated other types of polymers with textile fibre potential. Whinfield and Dickson discovered how to condense terephthalic acid and ethylene glycol to yield a new polymer which could be drawn into a fibre. Whinfield and Dickson patented their invention in July 1941, but due to wartime secrecy restrictions, it was not made public until 1946. ICI (Terylene) and DuPont (Dacron) went on to produce their own versions of the fibre.

Whinfield served as an assistant director of chemical research in the Ministry of Supply during World War II. In 1947 he joined ICI.

The library in the Department of Chemistry at the University of York is named in memory of Whinfield.

Awards
 Commander of the Order of the British Empire (1954) 
 Honorary fellowship of the Textile Institute (1955)
 Perkin Medal of the Society of Dyers and Colourists (1956)

References

1901 births
1966 deaths
English chemists
Textile scientists
Alumni of Gonville and Caius College, Cambridge
People educated at Merchant Taylors' School, Northwood
Commanders of the Order of the British Empire
Imperial Chemical Industries people
20th-century British inventors
20th-century agronomists